An editor is a person who edits (i.e. makes changes to) documents or audio-visual works. The term can also apply to software and hardware tools used to accomplish such changes.

People referred to as editor 
 Authors' editor, works with authors (rather than publishers) to make draft texts fit for purpose (sometimes called “manuscript editor”)
 Contributing editor, a magazine or book-publishing title, sometimes honorary, with a variety of meanings
 Copy editor, making formatting changes and other improvements to text (sometimes called "manuscript editor" in academic publishing)
 Developmental editor, an editor who supports authors before and during the drafting of a manuscript 
 Editor-at-large, a special kind of journalist
 Editor-in-chief, having final responsibility for a publication's operations and policies
 Film editor, person who selects and edits the raw footage of a film to create a finished motion picture
 Literary editor, in a newspaper or similar, deals with reviews or literary criticism
 Managing editor, senior member of a publication's management team
 Music editor (filmmaking), type of sound editor responsible for music
 Picture editor, or photo editor, collects and reviews photographs and/or illustrations for publication
 Script editor, works with the screenwriter and producer of television dramas and comedies
 Sound editor (filmmaking), prepares the sound on a film or television production
 Sound editor or audio editor, a role of an audio engineer

Computer tools referred to as editor 
 Digital audio editor, for editing audio data
 Graphics editor, for creating and manipulating visual images
 Raster graphics editor, for editing pictures in bitmap or raster format
 Vector graphics editor, for editing pictures in vector format
 Hex editor, for editing binary data
 HTML editor, for editing web pages
 Level editor, for editing levels of computer games
 MS-DOS Editor, a plain-text editor for MS-DOS and Microsoft Windows
 Source code editor, for editing source code
 Text editor, for editing plain text
 Visual editor, an editing program that displays text on screen as it is edited
 Word processor, for producing and editing any sort of printable material
 WYSIWYG editor, for editing and visualizing formatted text or graphics
 XML editor, for editing XML data

Other uses of editor 
 The Editor, a 2014 Canadian black comedy giallo film 
 The Editor (Doctor Who), a fictional character
 Editors (band), an English rock band 
 SS Editor, an American cargo ship in service 1919-41

See also 

 EDITED (company), a retail technology company based in London, England